Samsan may refer to:
 Semsan, a village in Iran
 Samsan-myeon (disambiguation), several townships in South Korea
 Samsan Station (disambiguation), several stations in South Korea

See also
 Samsan-dong